Owen Fitzpen (also known as Owen Phippen) was an English merchant taken captive by Barbary pirates and sold into slavery. He later mounted a heroic escape and is memorialised on a plaque placed in St. Mary's Church at Truro, Cornwall, England.

Childhood
Owen Fitzpen was born at Weymouth or Melcombe Regis, Dorset, in 1582, during the reign of Queen Elizabeth I. He was the son of Robert Fitzpen (1555–1589) and Cecily Jordon (born 1559). With the English victory over the Spanish Armada in 1588, England became the major naval power in the world and, as a result, her merchant trade thrived.

With the death of his father when Owen was 7 years old, it was natural that he, the eldest son and second child of the family, would take to the newly found opportunities in seafaring and merchant trade and he attained a high degree of success in the business. His sister Cecily, only two years his senior, worked with the mother to hold the family together, by then consisting of his brothers Robert, age 6, David, age 4 and George, age 2.

Career at sea
While it is not known at what age Fitzpen became an apprentice seaman, it is known that he left home not many years after his father's death and worked his way up quickly in the business. He was married to Annie Coinie on 3 July 1603 in a wedding ceremony said to be lavish for his time and reflective of the status of a young merchant seaman.

His family benefited from his wealth, George becoming first Master of the Truro Grammar School (1621–1635) and then a Rector at St. Mary's Church in the same town, where he served for the next 26 years. David went to America and settled at Hingham, Massachusetts, where he became an ancestor of several veterans of the American Revolution through which the Daughters of the American Revolution trace their ancestry.

Capture
The most famous chapter in Owen's life, however, began when he was taken captive by Turkish pirates on 24 March 1620, while on a trading voyage in the Mediterranean Sea. More than likely, these were Barbary pirates, as historical accounts of the time considered any of the Muslims in the Mediterranean region to be Turks. 

For seven years, Owen and a number of other Christian captives served as slaves to the Turks near present-day Algiers. Their chance for freedom finally came when Owen and 10 other Christian captives (Dutch and French) were herded aboard a corsair with 65 Turks to set sail for their next assignment. Owen and the 10 other captives fought against the Turks for three hours and suffered five of their number slain before the surviving Turks surrendered the ship. Owen and his crew sailed the ship to Cartagena, Spain, where news of the mutiny reached the King. 

Owen was summoned to Madrid where the king offered him a captain's position and great favor if he would convert to Catholicism. Owen respectfully declined, sold the ship for 6,000 pounds sterling and made his way back to England, where he settled near his brother George in Cornwall. Owen died at the village of Lamorran on 17 March 1636 at age 54. George had the memorial put in St. Mary's Church shortly thereafter.

Plaque inscription
The plaque reads as follows (original errors in spelling included): 

"The old record says Owen Phippen who most Valiantly freed himself from the Turks - This relates to his rescuing himself and companions after seven years bondage on board an Algerine Corsair, the history of which exploit is engraved upon a monument or tablet erected in his memory by his brother George, in St. Mary's church whiled he was settle over it. This church is a handsome Gothic structure built during the reign of Henry VIII on the north side of the chancel of which is a monumental inscription. 
"Glory to God in the Highest). . .to the pious and well - deserved memory of Owen Fitzpen alias Phippen, who travelled over many parts of the world and on 24 mar, 1620 was taken by the Turkes and made Captive in Algier. He projected Sundy plots for his libertie and on 17 June 1627 with 10 other Christian captives, Dutch and French (persivaded by his counsel and courage) he began a cruel fight with sixty-five Turkes in their own ship - which lasted three howers in which five of his company were slain yet God made him conquer and so he brought the ship in Cartagene being of 400 tons and 22 ord. The king sent for his to Madrid to see him - was offered a captaines place and a Kings favor if he would turn Papists, which he refused. He sold all for 6000 L returned to England, and died at Lamorran 17 Mar 1636. Melcomb in Dorset was his place of birth. Age 54 and here lies Earth in Earth."

A copy of the inscription can be seen in Lysons' Magna Britannia, Vol. III, Cornwall, p. 312; in Hitchins' Cornwall, Vol. II, p. 648, and in Orchard's Epitaphs.

Legacy
It is not known when the family name was changed from the old English form Fitzpen to Phippen, but it is generally believed this was done by his brother David to coincide with the move of his family to the Massachusetts Bay Colony. A number of David's descendants fought in the American Revolutionary War.

Owen and his wife, Annie, had at least three children born in Ireland before Owen's capture, one son of whom changed the spelling of the family name to Thigpen, yet a third variation. His grandson, James Thigpen, would be the first of his direct descendants to settle in America, this time to North Carolina. Thigpen's descendants would include two famous athletes, former National Football League player Yancey Thigpen (through slaveholders of the same name) and former Major League Baseball pitcher Bobby Thigpen.

Owen is also a first cousin (many times removed) of three U.S. presidents through his paternal grandfather: Zachary Taylor, Rutherford B. Hayes and John F. Kennedy.

See also

List of slaves

References

External links
Descendants of the Jordans

1582 births
1636 deaths
People from Weymouth, Dorset
People from Lamorran and Merther
17th-century English merchants
Burials in Cornwall
Slaves in the Ottoman Empire
17th-century slaves
Slaves from the Kingdom of England
Slavery in Algeria
17th-century memoirists